Aurat is a TV series starring Mandira Bedi as the protagonist, it aired on Doordarshan in late 1990s, and was later broadcast on Sony. This was a Baldev Raj Chopra production.

The series shows challenges and tribulations faced by women characters in society. The title song 'Ye aurat hai kudrat ka anmol tohfa' was sung by Jagjit Singh.

Aurat had many well known TV actors like Mandira Bedi, Aman Verma, Bijay Anand, Prabha Sinha and others.

Cast 

 Mandira Bedi as Pragati
  Aman Verma as Karanpratap Singh
 Surendra Pal as Rudrapratap Singh
 Raman Khatri as Inspector Vikram
 Shashi Sharma as Mrs. Rudrapratap Singh
 Prabha Sinha as Asha
 Bijay Anand as Rajesh Kumar
 Raman Kapoor as Vinodpratap Singh
 Sonia Kapoor as Kusumpratap Singh
 Virendra Razdan as Rajendra Kumar
 Kaushal Kapoor as Inspector Tiwari
 Sagar Salunkhe as Anand
 Adarsh Gautam as Vikas
 Anwar Fatehan as Mukhiya
 Dharmesh Tiwari as Dharmesh Tripathi
 Neelam Sagar
 Pradeep Sharma as Bhupinder Singh
 Deep Dhillon as Grover
 Kapil Kumar Kochar as Harish Shah
 Manju Vyas as Mrs. Modi
 Shekhar Navre as Mr. Modi
 Anupam Bhattacharya as Sanjay
 Rajesh Puri as Issa Bhai
 Mohan Azad as Moosa
 Manish Khanna as Ranjeet Makhija
 Mulraj Rajda as Durgaprasad
 Aruna Sanghal as Minnie Grover

References 

DD National original programming
1990s Indian television series
Indian drama television series